The UEFA Futsal Euro 2014 was the ninth edition of the European Championship for men's national futsal teams organised by UEFA. It was hosted for the first time in Belgium, from 28 January to 8 February 2014, following a decision of the UEFA Executive Committee in December 2011.

The final tournament was contested by twelve teams, eleven of which joined the hosts after overcoming a qualifying tournament. The matches were played in two venues in the city of Antwerp, the Lotto Arena (group stage) and the Sportpaleis (knockout stage). Television coverage was provided by Eurosport and Eurosport 2.

The defending champions, Spain, were beaten in the semifinals by Russia and thus failed to reach their fifth consecutive tournament final. In the decisive match, Italy defeated Russia 3–1 to win their second title. Spain defeated Portugal 8–4 in the third place match to secure a ninth consecutive podium finish.  The top scorer of the tournament was Eder Lima of Russia, with eight goals.

Venues

The final tournament matches were played in two venues located in Antwerp's Merksem district. The Lotto Arena hosted the twelve group stage matches, while the remaining eight matches, including the final, were staged in the Sportpaleis arena.

Qualification

The qualification draw was made in Nyon on 4 December 2012.

Qualified teams

1 Bold indicates champion for that year
2 Italic indicates host for that year

Draw
The final tournament draw was held in Antwerp's Centrum Elzenveld, on 4 October 2013.

Match officials
UEFA named sixteen match officials to referee matches at the 2014 UEFA Futsal Euro final tournament.

Squads

Group stage
In the group stage, a total of twelve matches (three matches per group) were played between 28 January and 2 February at a rate of two matches each day. The teams finishing in the top two positions in each of the four groups progressed to the knockout stage, while the third-placed team was eliminated from the tournament.

Tie-breaking
If two or more teams were equal on points on completion of the group matches, the following tie-breaking criteria were applied:
 Higher number of points obtained in the matches played between the teams in question;
 Superior goal difference resulting from the matches played between the teams in question;
 Higher number of goals scored in the matches played between the teams in question.
If, after having applied criteria 1–3, teams still have an equal ranking, criteria 1–3 are reapplied to determine their final ranking. If this does not lead to a decision, the following criteria apply:
 Superior goal difference in all group matches;
 Higher number of goals scored in all group matches;
 Fair play ranking of the teams in question;
 Drawing of lots.

All times local (CET or UTC+01:00).

Group A

Group B

Group C

Group D

Knockout stage
The knockout stage matches, which includes quarter-finals, semi-finals, third place play-off and the final, will be played at the Sportpaleis arena. If a match is drawn after 40 minutes of regular play, an extra-time consisting of two five-minute periods is played. If teams are still leveled after extra-time, a penalty shoot-out is used to determine the winner. In the third place match, the extra-time is skipped and the decision goes directly to kicks from the penalty mark.

Bracket

Quarterfinals

Semifinals

Third place match

Final

Final ranking

Goalscorers
Only goals scored in the final tournament are considered.

8 goals
  Eder Lima

5 goals
  Fernandão

4 goals

  Rodolfo Fortino
  Gabriel Lima
  Gašper Vrhovec

3 goals

  Franko Jelovčić
  Sergio Romano
  Cardinal
  Joel Queirós
  Ricardinho
  Robinho
  Sergei Sergeev
  Aicardo
  Sergio Lozano
  Pola
  Rafa Usín

2 goals

  Rafael
  Matija Capar
  Michal Belej
  Gonçalo Alves
  Bruno Coelho
  Cirilo
  Dmitri Lyskov
  Kristjan Čujec
  Raúl Campos
  Lin
  Miguelín
  José Ruiz

1 goal

  Amadeu
  Augusto
  Vitaliy Borisov
  Edu
  Felipe
  Omar Rahou
  Saša Babić
  Dario Marinović
  Roman Mareš
  Jiří Novotný
  Saad Assis
  Daniel Giasson
  Humberto Honorio
  Stefano Mammarella
  Michele Miarelli
  Murilo
  Vampeta
  Mohamed Attaibi
  Pedro Cary
  Pedro Costa
  João Matos
  Arnaldo Pereira
  Vlad Iancu
  Robert Lupu
  Florin Matei
  Emil Răducu
  Aleksandr Fukin
  Nikolai Pereverzev
  Vladislav Shayakhmetov
  Alen Fetić
  Uroš Kroflič
  Igor Osredkar
  Ortiz
  Dmytro Sorokin
  Yevgen Valenko
  Marian Șotărcă
  Sergei Abramov

1 own goal
  Saad Salhi (against Romania)
  Aleksandr Fukin (against Portugal)

References

External links
 Official UEFA website

 
2014
2014
UEFA
UEFA Futsal Euro
Sports competitions in Antwerp
2010s in Antwerp
January 2014 sports events in Europe
February 2014 sports events in Europe